The 1978 Men's Hockey World Cup was the fourth Hockey World Cup men's field hockey tournament. It was held in Buenos Aires, Argentina. It was won by Pakistan, who defeated the Netherlands 3–1 in the final. The host nation, Argentina, finished eighth.

Results

Pool A
 
 Qualified for semifinals

Defending champions India were to play Belgium on 18 March 1978 as the opening fixture of the tournament but was postponed due to heavy rains the previous day.

Fixtures

Pool B
 
 Qualified for semifinals

Fifth to fourteenth place classification

Thirteenth and fourteenth place

Ninth to twelfth place qualifiers

Eleventh and twelfth place

Ninth and tenth place

Fifth to eighth place qualifiers

Seventh and eighth place

Fifth and sixth place

First to fourth place classification

Semi-finals

Third and fourth place

Final

Pakistan
Saleem Sherwani, Munawwaruz Zaman, Saeed Ahmed, Muhammad Shafiq, Rana Ehsanullah, Akhtar Rasool, Islahuddin Siddique, Hanif Khan, Manzoor Hussain, Shahnaz Sheikh, Samiullah Khan

Netherlands
Maarten Sikking, André Bolhuis, Imbert Jebbink, Geert van Eijk, Hans Jorritsma, Ties Kruize, Theo Doyer, Ron Steens, Paul Litjens, Tim Steens, Wouter Leefers

References
 

Men's Hockey World Cup
Sports competitions in Buenos Aires
International field hockey competitions hosted by Argentina
1978 in Argentine sport
1978 in field hockey
1970s in Buenos Aires
March 1978 sports events in South America
April 1978 sports events in South America